Tom Clapp (25 October 1858 – 15 October 1933) was an English-born international rugby union forward who played club rugby for Newport and Nantyglo RFC. He won 14 caps for Wales and captained the team on three occasions. Clapp was the first Newport player to captain Wales.

Rugby career
Born in Portman Square, Marylebone, London in 1858, but raised in Somerset, Clapp's family moved to Nantyglo when he was still in his youth. Clapp would play his early rugby for Blaina before moving to Nantyglo RFC. In 1883 he moved to first class team Newport and Clapp made an impression on the club as in the 1884/85 and the 1885/86 seasons he was made team captain. In May 1888 Clapp left Welsh rugby behind and emigrated to the United States of America following his brother David who left a year earlier. In 1920 both brothers were citrus fruit farmers in California.

International career
Clapp gained his first cap in 1882 against Ireland, a game in which he scored a try. The next two games, against England and Scotland, were his last for Nantyglo. Clapp would represent Wales in 14 matches and on 12 March 1887 he captained Wales at Birkenhead Park against Ireland. Wales won the game due to a try being worth a single point, as they were out scored 3 tries to one, but a drop goal from Arthur Gould gave the visitors the win. Clapp retained the captaincy for the next match against Scotland, and led his country in their first win against the Scottish team. His next game against Ireland, on 3 March 1888, would not only be his last as captain, but his last in the Welsh shirt.

International matches played
Wales
  1883, 1884, 1885, 1887
  1882, 1884, 1887, 1888
  1883, 1884, 1885, 1886, 1887, 1888

Bibliography

References

1858 births
1933 deaths
Blaina RFC players
English rugby union players
Newport RFC players
Rugby union fullbacks
Rugby union players from Marylebone
Wales international rugby union players
Wales rugby union captains